Old Town (formerly, Williamsburg) is an unincorporated community in Kern County, California.

The name Williamsburg honored James E. Williams, a businessman.  A post office operated at Old Town from 1877 (being transferred from Tehichipa) to 1885.

References

Unincorporated communities in Kern County, California
Unincorporated communities in California